Charbonnel may refer to:

Armand-François-Marie de Charbonnel OFM Cap (1802–1891), the Bishop of Toronto from 1847 to 1860
Jean Charbonnel (1927–2014), French politician
Jean-Michel Charbonnel (born 1952), French long-distance runner
Marie Charbonnel (1880–1969), French contralto opera singer

See also
269243 Charbonnel, minor planet
Pointe de Charbonnel, mountain of Savoie, France
École secondaire catholique Monseigneur-de-Charbonnel, French-language Catholic school in Toronto, Canada
Charbonnel et Walker, British firm of chocolate makers
Carbonnel (disambiguation)